Edna Township is one of sixteen townships in Cass County, Iowa, USA.  As of the 2000 census, its population was 140.

Geography
According to the USGS, it contains two cemeteries: Reno and Calvary in the Saint Timothy Roman Catholic Church yard.

History

Chief Mahaska was buried along the Nodaway River in Edna Township after he was killed in 1834.

References

External links
 US-Counties.com
 City-Data.com

Townships in Cass County, Iowa
Townships in Iowa